Benthamiella is a genus of plants in the family Solanaceae, native to Patagonia in southern South America. Its species have been described as "attractive, small, cushion plants".

Description
All the species of Benthamiella are low-growing cushions or mats, with small overlapping leaves, and flowers with short or no stems, appearing within or just above the leaves. The flowers are typical of those of the Solanaceae (nightshade family), being tubular with five free lobes at the end. Most species have white or pale yellow flowers, although deeper yellows are found and Benthamiella nordenskioldii may have flowers tinged with violet.

Taxonomy
The genus was first described in 1883 by Carlo Luigi Spegazzini. The name commemorates George Bentham, whose great work (with Joseph Dalton Hooker), Genera Plantarum, setting out the "Bentham & Hooker system", was completed in that year.

Two species, Benthamiella azorella and Benthamiella spegazziniana, were at one time placed in a separate genus Saccardophytum, on the basis of two rather than five exserted stamens (i.e. stamens appearing outside the flower tube). They are now considered to be part of Benthamiella.

Species
, The Plant List accepts the following species:

Benthamiella azorella (Skottsb.) C.Soriano
Benthamiella azorelloides Speg.
Benthamiella chubutensis C.Soriano
Benthamiella graminifolia Skottsb.
Benthamiella lanata C.Soriano
Benthamiella longifolia Speg.
Benthamiella nordenskioldii Dusén ex N.E.Br. (also spelt B. nordenskjoldii)
Benthamiella patagonica Speg.
Benthamiella pycnophylloides Speg.
Benthamiella skottsbergii C.Soriano
Benthamiella sorianoi S.Arroyo
Benthamiella spegazziniana C.Soriano

Distribution and habitat
The genus is found only in Patagonia, split between Argentina and Chile, with the most species (nine) being found in the Argentine province of Santa Cruz.

Benthamiella species are found in treeless areas of open countryside, ranging from low-lying areas of central Patagonia to areas above . Most receive  of rain a year. Only B. nordenskioldii is found in the alpine zone.

Cultivation
, four species were in cultivation: B. azorella, B. longifolia, B. nordenskioldii and B. patagonica. The last of these grows and flowers well.

References

Solanaceae
Solanaceae genera
Flora of southern South America
Taxa named by Carlo Luigi Spegazzini